Paul Groves may refer to:

Paul Groves (Australian coach) (born 1982),  Australian rules football coach
Paul Groves (footballer) (born 1966),  English footballer
Paul Groves (poet) (born 1947), British poet and critic
Paul Groves (rugby league) (born 1965), English rugby player
Paul Groves (tenor) (born 1964), American opera singer